Martina Hingis and Sabine Lisicki were the defending champions, but Lisicki chose to participate in the Hopman Cup instead. Hingis played alongside Sania Mirza and successfully defended her title, defeating Andrea Petkovic and Angelique Kerber in the final, 7–5, 6–1.

Seeds

Draw

References 
Main Draw

Brisbane International Doubles
Women's Doubles